This is a list of species in genus Peniophora. , Index Fungorum lists 176 species in the genus.


A
Peniophora adjacens
Peniophora admirabilis
Peniophora alba
Peniophora albobadia
Peniophora albofarcta
Peniophora albugo
Peniophora amaniensis
Peniophora ambiens
Peniophora anaemacta
Peniophora arachnoidea
Peniophora argentea
Peniophora argentinensis
Peniophora asperipilata
Peniophora aurantiaca
Peniophora avellanea

B
Peniophora bartholomaei
Peniophora bicornis
Peniophora boidinii
Peniophora bonariensis
Peniophora borbonica
Peniophora bruneiensis
Peniophora burkei

C
Peniophora caesalpiniae
Peniophora calcea
Peniophora canadensis
Peniophora carnea
Peniophora ceracea
Peniophora cinerea
Peniophora citrinella
Peniophora coccinea
Peniophora coffeae
Peniophora colorea
Peniophora confusa
Peniophora coprosmae
Peniophora corsica
Peniophora costata
Peniophora crassitunicata
Peniophora crustosa
Peniophora cystidendroides

D
Peniophora decidua
Peniophora decolorans
Peniophora decorticans
Peniophora dipyrenosperma
Peniophora discoidea
Peniophora disparens
Peniophora duplex

E
Peniophora elaeidis
Peniophora ericina
Peniophora erikssonii
Peniophora excurrens
Peniophora exima

F
Peniophora farinacea
Peniophora farlowii
Peniophora fasticata
Peniophora fimbriata
Peniophora firma
Peniophora fissilis
Peniophora fissoreticulata
Peniophora flammea
Peniophora formosana
Peniophora fracta
Peniophora frangulae
Peniophora fulvissima
Peniophora fulvocinerea
Peniophora fumigata

G
Peniophora gabonensis
Peniophora gelatinosula
Peniophora gilbertsonii
Peniophora grisea
Peniophora guadelupensis

H
Peniophora halimi
Peniophora hilitzeri

I
Peniophora incarnata
Peniophora indica
Peniophora inflata
Peniophora investiens
Peniophora irregularis
Peniophora isabellina

J
Peniophora junipericola

K
Peniophora kalchbrenneri
Peniophora kauffmanii

L
Peniophora laeta
Peniophora laminata
Peniophora laurentii
Peniophora laxitexta
Peniophora lepida
Peniophora lilacea
Peniophora limitata
Peniophora limonia
Peniophora lithargyrina
Peniophora livescens
Peniophora lutea
Peniophora lycii

M
Peniophora macrocystidiata
Peniophora malaiensis
Peniophora malenconii
Peniophora manshurica
Peniophora media
Peniophora meridionalis
Peniophora mimica
Peniophora miniata
Peniophora molesta
Peniophora monticola
Peniophora multicolor
Peniophora multicystidiata
Peniophora muscorum

N
Peniophora niphodes
Peniophora nuda

O
Peniophora odorata
Peniophora ovalispora
Peniophora overholtsii
Peniophora oxydata

P
Peniophora parvocystidiata
Peniophora peckii
Peniophora perexigua
Peniophora piceae
Peniophora pilatiana
Peniophora pinastri
Peniophora pini
Peniophora pithya
Peniophora poincianae
Peniophora polygonia
Peniophora proxima
Peniophora pruinata
Peniophora pseudonuda
Peniophora pseudopini
Peniophora pseudoversicolor
Peniophora puberula
Peniophora pusilla

Q
Peniophora quercina

R
Peniophora reidii
Peniophora rhodocarpa
Peniophora rhodochroa
Peniophora robusta
Peniophora rudis
Peniophora rufomarginata

S
Peniophora sacrata
Peniophora scintillans
Peniophora separans
Peniophora septentrionalis
Peniophora seymouriana
Peniophora shearii
Peniophora simulans
Peniophora sordidella
Peniophora sordidissima
Peniophora sororia
Peniophora spathulata
Peniophora sphaerocystidiata
Peniophora stratosa
Peniophora subavellanea
Peniophora subcarneola
Peniophora subdiscolor
Peniophora subgigaspora
Peniophora subglebulosa
Peniophora subpirispora
Peniophora subsalmonea
Peniophora subsulphurea
Peniophora subtilis
Peniophora suecica

T
Peniophora tabacina
Peniophora taiwanensis
Peniophora tamaricicola
Peniophora taraguiensis
Peniophora taxodii
Peniophora tenella
Peniophora tenuissima
Peniophora texana
Peniophora thujae
Peniophora trigonosperma

V
Peniophora vernicosa
Peniophora versicolor
Peniophora versiformis
Peniophora verticillata
Peniophora violaceolivida
Peniophora viridis

W
Peniophora wallacei

Z
Peniophora zonata

References 

Peniophora